Connaught Place, officially known as Rajiv Chowk, is one of the main financial, commercial and business centres in New Delhi, Delhi, India. It houses the headquarters of several noted Indian firms and is a major shopping, nightlife and tourist destination in New Delhi.

The main commercial area of the new city, New Delhi, occupies a place of pride in the city and are counted among the top heritage structures in New Delhi. It was developed as a showpiece of Lutyens' Delhi with a prominent Central Business District (Delhi). Named after Prince Arthur, 1st Duke of Connaught and Strathearn, construction work began in 1929 and was completed in 1933. It was designed by Robert Tor Russell. It was renamed in 1995 after former Prime Minister of India, Rajiv Gandhi.

The area today falls under the jurisdiction of New Delhi Municipal Council (NDMC) and is therefore allotted a high priority in term of funds for maintenance and upkeep. New Delhi Traders Association (NDTA) is the association of establishments (like retails stores, restaurants, halls, offices) in Connaught Place. NDTA also plays a major role in liaising with government bodies like NDMC in order to represent the commercial interests and maintenance issues of Connaught Place establishments.

A metro railway station built under it is also named Rajiv Chowk metro station.

History
Prior to the construction of Connaught Place, the area was a ridge, covered with kikar trees and populated with jackals and wild pigs. Residents of the Kashmere Gate, Civil Lines area visited during the weekends for partridge hunting. The Hanuman Temple attracted many visitors from the old walled city, who came only on Tuesdays and Saturdays and before sunset, as the return trip was considered dangerous.

Residents of villages including Madhoganj, Jaisingh Pura and Raja ka Bazaar were evicted to clear the area for the construction of Connaught Place and the development of its nearby areas. The villages were once situated along the historic Qutb Road, the main road connecting Shahjahanabad, the walled city of Delhi (now known as Old Delhi) to Qutb Minar in South Delhi city since the Mughal era. The displaced people have relocated in Karol Bagh to the west, a rocky area populated only by trees and wild bushes. However, three structures were spared demolition.  These were Hanuman temple, a Jain temple in Jaisinghpura and the Jantar Mantar.

Construction

Plans to have a central business district were developed as the construction of the new capital of imperial India began to take shape. Headed by W.H. Nicholls, the chief architect to the Government of India, the plans featured a central plaza based on the European Renaissance and in the Classical style. However Nicholls left India in 1917, and with Lutyens and Baker busy working on larger buildings in the capital, design of the plaza eventually fell to Robert Tor Russell, chief architect to the Public Works Department (PWD), Government of India.

Named after Prince Arthur, 1st Duke of Connaught (1850–1942), third son of Queen Victoria and uncle of King George VI of the United Kingdom, who visited India in 1921 and laid the foundation of the Council House (now Sansad Bhavan, or Parliament House). It was renamed to Rajiv Chowk in 2013, after former Prime Minister of India, Rajiv Gandhi.

Connaught Place's Georgian architecture is modelled after the Royal Crescent in Bath, designed by the architect John Wood the Younger and built between 1767 and 1774. While the Royal Crescent is semi-circular and a three storied residential structure, Connaught Place had only two floors, which made almost a complete circle intended to house commercial establishments on the ground with residential space on the first floor. The circle was eventually designed with two concentric circles, creating an Inner Circle, Middle Circle and the Outer Circle with seven roads radiating from a circular central park known as Radial Roads. As per the original plan, the different blocks of Connaught Place were to be joined from above, employing archways, with radial roads below them. However, the circle was 'broken up' to give it a grander scale. Even the blocks were originally planned to be  in height but later reduced to the present two-storied structure with an open colonnade.

Government plans to have New Delhi Railway Station built inside Central Park were rejected by railway authorities as they found the idea impractical, and instead chose the nearby Paharganj area. Finally construction work began in 1929, with the construction of Viceroy's house or Rashtrapati Bhavan, Secretariat Building, Parliament House, and All-India War Memorial, India Gate were completed by 1933, long after the inauguration of the city in 1931.

Early years
Early commercial establishments belonged to traders from the Kashmere Gate area: Kanter's, Galgotia and Snowhite. Some of the other oldest and still existing establishments include Ram Chandra & Sons (since 1935), Novex (since 1937), Dhoomi Mal Gallery (since 1936), Vaish at Rivoli (since 1939), Indian Arts Palace (since 1935), Mahatta & Company (since 1947). Most of the rulers of the Indian princely states had their local homes in the nearby areas around King's way (modern-day Rajpath), and would frequent shops for designer clothes, artifacts, shoes, and pianos. Regal cinema, the first cinema in Connaught Place, opened around this time and went on to host popular concerts, theatre groups, and ballet performances. The Odeon and Rivoli followed the Regal, while the Indian Talkie House opened in 1938. Initially only Indian snacks were available in the area, but gradually restaurants opened in the plaza, with names like Kwality, United Coffee House and others offering Continental and Mughlai cuisines. Wenger's, the confectioners, was one of the first shops in Connaught Place, the firm also owned the largest restaurant in New Delhi on the first floor of their present A-Block outlet. Originally established in 1926 as Spencers in Kashmere Gate, Wenger's was owned by a Swiss couple and introduced Delhi to pastries and homemade Swiss chocolates, though in its early years it too was patronised mostly by British officers, Indian royalty and some foreign-returned businessmen, for Delhi was still the city of classical taste within the walled city. Over the years Wenger's started another shop right beside their previous one in Connaught Place's A Block, which earlier belonged to Harnarains, a Pickle brand that has been in existence since 1860s. Harnarains currently operates under the name Harnarains International. Davico's across Connaught Plaza, and the Standard restaurant was popular for decades before fading away. Another old timer, the Embassy Restaurant, opened in 1948.

New Delhi's first luxury hotel opened in 1931 on Janpath and eventually became a haunt for the royalty and a place for political discussions. It was here that Jawaharlal Nehru, Mohandas K. Gandhi, Muhammad Ali Jinnah and Lord Mountbatten met to discuss the Partition of India and the birth of Pakistan.

Residents gradually moved into first-floor quarters, which were almost full by 1938, but it was another decade before the plaza became the busy marketplace that it became later, as World War II started and the Independence movement reached a feverish pitch.  Markets experienced dwindling sales, but post-independence business began to increase in the 1950s.

Post-independence
Until the 1980s, a Phatphat Sewa, a Harley Davidson rickshaw service, took visitors from Connaught Place to the Red Fort and Chandani Chowk, before it was stopped due to pollution concerns. The empty block of the Inner Circle came into use in the late 1970s with the construction of an underground market, the first in Delhi, Palika Bazaar at the junction point.  Stretching up to the Outer Circle, it also came with an adjoining underground parking lot. Also in the 1970s, the State Emporiums on Baba Karak Singh Marg radial emerged. However, a major alteration in the skyline was the addition of red sandstone (inspired by the historic Red Fort) and glass skyscraper, the Jeevan Bharti building (LIC building), designed by architect Charles Correa.  In 1986, it towered over the low-lying and predominantly white Connaught Place and was criticised for being too futuristic, but gradually as other skyscrapers were built on the periphery, the debate faded away.

Cinemas
After the introduction of talkies to Indian cinema in 1931, the new medium became a craze and in the 1930s and the 40s, four theatres opened within Connaught Place Plaza: Regal, Rivoli, Odeon and a short-lived "Indian Talkie House" that opened in 1938. Connaught Place became the entertainment hub of New Delhi. The Regal, the first theatre in the area, was opened in 1932 by Sir Sobha Singh. It was designed by architect Walter Sykes George and mainly hosted stage performances. In the coming years it hosted Western Classical music artists, Russian ballet and British theatre groups, and soon started morning and afternoon movie shows. The next theatre to be built was the Plaza in 1940, designed by Sir Robert Tor Russell, the architect of Connaught Place itself. It was owned by director and actor Sohrab Modi until the early 1950s. The Odeon was built in 1945 and had the city's second 70mm screen after the "Shiela Cinema" in Paharganj. The Rivoli, close to the Regal, was the smallest theatre in the area. Half a century later most of the theatres were still running, although most had changed ownership. The Plaza and Rivoli are now owned by a multiplex giant PVR Cinemas, while the Odeon is a joint venture with Reliance Big Pictures.

Today

The area is instantly recognisable on any map of Delhi as a big circle in the middle with radial roads spreading out in all directions. Eight separate roads lead out from Connaught Places's inner circle, named Parliament Street and Radial Roads 1 through 7. Twelve different roads lead out from Connaught Circus, the outer ring. The best known of these is Janpath, the continuation of Radial Road 1. It is a logically planned area and houses one of India's first underground markets, the Palika Bazaar (Municipal Market), named after nagarpalika. The Outer Circle is known as the Connaught Circus (officially Indira Chowk), having rows of restaurants, shops and hotels, and on 1 December 2017, The Regal Building was reopened as Madame Tussaud's Wax Museum, the very first in India. The Middle Circle has offices, Banks, Exchange houses such as Thomascook, Atwexchange, PVR cinema and eating outlets.

Central Park 

Connaught Place's central park has long been a venue for cultural events and is a popular hangout for locals. In 2005–06, it was rebuilt after the construction of the Delhi Metro station below it. That station, Rajiv Chowk, is the interchange for the Yellow and Blue lines of the Metro and one of the largest and busiest stations in the network.

Connaught Place hosts various cultural events in the central park area such as the Urdu Heritage Festival, One Billion Rising demonstrations, Delhi Government's Youth Festival, Awam Ki Awaz (Voices of People) concert and many others.

National flag at Central Park

The first known Indian to hoist the tricolour flag at Connaught Place is Padma Shri Mir Mushtaq Ahmad, the first Chief Executive Councillor of Delhi. Prior to independence, when Connaught Place was considered the heart of imperial British India, he would hoist the tricolour at the bandstand in Central Park each year on 26 January. The pole on which it is hoisted measures .

Delhi blasts

Two of the five terrorist blasts that occurred during the 13 September 2008 Delhi bombings were in Connaught Place. Ten people were injured after police and witnesses said that the bombs went off in garbage cans in and around Connaught Place. There was also one bomb blast in nearby Central Park. Authorities also discovered two undetonated bombs in Delhi, one located at the Regal cinema complex in Connaught Place. As a response, all rubbish bins were removed from the area for security reasons.

Redevelopment plans

By the late 2020 Connaught Place had lost much of its old glory, although the charm of the market continued to attract foot traffic. As a part of its 'Return to Heritage Project', the New Delhi Municipal Council (NDMC) prepared a plan to revamp and redevelop this Delhi landmark. The plan included the provision of heritage sensitive signage, engineering improvements of roads, drainage sewerage, water supply and substations, development of a traffic management plan, provisions of street furniture including adequate parking, walkways etc. and enhancing the structural stability of all buildings including retrofitting for earthquake resistance. All these components have been identified based on studies conducted by various reputed agencies such as SPA, RITES, CMCCC and NTPAC, etc.

The redevelopment work was slated to be completed in time for the 2010 Commonwealth Games held at Delhi, but due to huge cost overruns and undue delays, this deadline was not met. The Performance Audit Report prepared by Controller and Auditor General, India, on the Commonwealth Games 2010 concluded that there were "significant deficiencies in contract management, with consequent avoidable expenditure". Moreover, the mis-management and delays caused great inconvenience to shoppers and shop-owners alike, and led to a decline in trade. Many store-owners complained of erratic power supplies and lost air-conditioning in their shops during the renovation work.

Work on the renovation was resumed soon after the Commonwealth Games, and was scheduled to meet the new deadline of December 2012. Till 2016 only the first phase for renovating blocks A & B has taken place. By 2020 all the six blocks of Connaught Place would be renovated and brought to their original glory.

The art project United Buddy Bears was presented in Connaught Place during the summer of 2012.

On 5 January 2017, the Union Urban Development Ministry announced a plan to convert the middle and inner circles of Connaught Place, into an exclusive pedestrian zone, starting February 2017. As a result, people driving into the area will now have to park their vehicles at designated parking slots like Shivaji Stadium, Palika Bazaar and then either walk to Connaught Place or use the shuttle bus service. However, Bicycles will be allowed in the pedestrian zones.
This move however does not have any planning as of 24 January 2017 and may be totally scrapped as the current infrastructure is insufficient to support the pedestrianisation of Connaught Place, Naresh Kumar Chairman of NDMC Reported Hindustan Times.

Films
Over the years, Connaught Place has been location many films including sequences in Dil Se.. (1998), Hazaaron Khwaishein Aisi (2003), Pyaar Ke Side Effects (2006), 3 Idiots (2009), Aisha (2010), Delhi Belly (2011), Rockstar (2011), Ahista Ahista (2006), Agent Vinod, Vicky Donor (2012),  Hate Story (2011), Special 26 (2013), A Wednesday (2008), Rang De Basanti (2006), PK (2014) and 2 States (2014).

Visitor attractions
Agrasen ki Baoli, Connaught Place
 The Imperial, New Delhi
 National Philatelic Museum, New Delhi
 Madame Tussauds Delhi
 Jantar Mantar, Delhi

Nearby areas 
 Barakhamba Road and Kasturba Gandhi Marg - Major center for prominent international banks and other large corporate offices.
 Janpath and Baba Kharak Singh Marg - Major shopping area for local Indian Handicrafts with large number of small shops. The ancient Hanuman Temple is on Baba Kharag Singh Marg.
 Parliament Street - Hub for government offices. Jantar Mantar and NDMC offices are situated on this major road.
 New Delhi railway station
 Babar road and Bengali Market - only residential area near Connaught Place.

Picture gallery

See also 
Other commercial centres in Delhi metropolitan area:

Janakpuri
Nehru Place
Rajendra Place
Shivaji Place
South Extension

References

External links

New Delhi Municipal Council (NDMC)

Buildings and structures completed in 1933
Central business districts in India
Georgian Revival architecture
Neighbourhoods in Delhi
New Delhi district
Shopping districts and streets in India
Road junctions in India
Squares in India
20th-century architecture in India